Monica Vinader Ltd. is a British jewellery brand producing and retailing necklaces, pendants, earrings, rings, and friendship bracelets. It markets itself as crafted demi-fine jewellery positioned and priced in the "gap between fine and fashion jewellery".

History 
In 2002, whilst working in Argentina, Monica Vinader, the brand's now-creative director and namesake, began creating bespoke jewellery pieces for private clients. Envisaging an opportunity larger than what bespoke commissions could offer, Vinader would relocate to the United Kingdom by 2007 and, in the same year, formally launching the eponymous company with her sister Gabriela Vinader as co-founder. With demand and sales growing, the company won Retail Jewellers' "Jewellery Brand of the Year" award two years after it was founded. By 2014, it was projecting that it would sales would surpass £14 million in jewellery, up 85% on the previous year.

Profitable from 2009, the company secured funding from London-based venture capital firm Beringea in 2010, using it to open their first store on London's South Molton Street. A second round of funding followed in May 2013, with the company raising a further £1.5M from Beringea and a separate £1M from the Clark Group. Beringea invested an additional £1.5M, and the Clark Group invested £1M as part of the deal. Monica Vinader have launched their Esencia Collection  and opened a new store at Canary Wharf. Since 2016 Catherine, Duchess of Cambridge has been noted by fashion websites for wearing a pair of onyx Monica Vinander earrings many times.

Collaborations 
Since 2019, Monica Vinader has worked jointly with other creatives in order to launch collaborative collections, first with editor Caroline Issa and subsequently with sustainable fashion advocate Doina Ciobanu.
 Across three, sell-out sustainable collections in 2020 and 2021, Ciobanu led a move to sustainable sourcing for the jeweller with collections comprising 100% recycled silver and gold alongside sustainably sourced pearls. An as yet unreleased collaboration with Florence St. George will see Monica Vinader release its first homeware collection.

References

External links
 Official website

British jewellery designers
British companies established in 2007
Women jewellers